Sremska Mitrovica is a city and the administrative center of the Srem District in the autonomous province of Vojvodina, Serbia. It is situated on the left bank of the Sava river. , the city has a total population of 37,751 inhabitants, while its administrative area has a population of 79,940 inhabitants.

As Sirmium, it was a capital of the Roman Empire during the Tetrarchy of 4th century CE. Ten Roman emperors were born in or near this city, Emperors Herennius Etruscus (251), Hostilian (251), Decius Traian (249–251), Claudius Gothicus (268–270), Quintillus (270), Aurelian (270–275), Probus (276–282), Maximian (285–310), Constantius II (337–361) and Gratian (367–383).

Name
The modern town name is Sremska Mitrovica. The Hungarian name was Szávaszentdemeter while in Croatian it is referred to as Srijemska Mitrovica.

Mitrovica stems from Saint Demetrius or "Sveti Dimitrije" in Serbian. Sremska Mitrovica means Mitrovica of Syrmia with Sremska distinguishing it from Kosovska Mitrovica.

The name of the city during the reign of the Roman Empire was Sirmium. Beginning in 1180 AD the name changed from "Civitas Sancti Demetrii" to "Dmitrovica", "Mitrovica", and finally to the present form - "Sremska Mitrovica".

History

Ancient Sirmium

Sremska Mitrovica is one of the oldest cities in Europe. Archaeologists have found a trace of organized human life dating from 5000 BC onwards. Ionian jewellery dating to 500BC was excavated in the city. When the Romans conquered the city in the 1st century BC, Sirmium already was a settlement with a long tradition. In the 1st century, Sirmium gained a status of a colony of the citizens of Rome, and became a very important military and strategic location in Pannonia province. The war expeditions of Roman emperors Trajan, Marcus Aurelius, and Claudius II, were prepared in Sirmium.

In 103, Pannonia was split into two provinces: Pannonia Superior and Pannonia Inferior, and Sirmium became the capital city of the latter. In 296, Diocletian implemented a new territorial division of Pannonia. Instead of previous two provinces, there were four new provinces established in former territory of original Pannonia: Pannonia Prima, Pannonia Valeria, Pannonia Savia and Pannonia Secunda. Capital city of Pannonia Secunda was Sirmium.

In 293, with the establishment of tetrarchy, the Roman Empire was split into four parts; Sirmium became one of the four capital cities of the Empire, the other three being Augusta Treverorum, Mediolanum, and Nicomedia (modern Trier, Milan and Izmit). During the tetrarchy, Sirmium was the capital of emperor Galerius. With the establishment of praetorian prefectures in 318, the capital of the prefecture of Illyricum was Sirmium.

Beginning in the 4th century, the city was an important Christian centre, and was a seat of the Episcopate of Sirmium. Four Christian councils were held in Sirmium. At the end of the 4th century, Sirmium was brought under the sway of the Goths, and later, was again annexed to the Eastern Roman Empire. In 441, Sirmium was conquered by the Huns, and after this conquest, it remained for more than a century in the hands of various Germanic tribes, such were Eastern Goths and Gepids.

For a short time, Sirmium was the center of the Gepide State and the king Cunimund minted golden coins in it. After 567, Sirmium was again incorporated into Eastern Roman Empire. The city was conquered and destroyed by Avars in 582. This event marked the end of the period of late Antiquity in the history of Sirmium.

11 luxurious golden belts of Avar handicraft dating to the 6th century was excavated in the vicinity.

After the Avar conquest
For the next two centuries Sirmium was a place of little importance. At the end of the 8th century, Sirmium belonged to the Frankish State. The historical role of Sirmium increased again in the 9th century, when it was part of the Bulgarian Empire. Pope Adrian II gave St Methodius the title of Archbishop of Sirmium. After having adopted Christianity, the Bulgarians restored in Sirmium the Christian Episcopate, having in mind old Christian traditions and the reputation this city had in the ancient world.

In the 11th century, Sirmium was a residence of Sermon, a duke of Syrmia, who was a vassal of the Bulgarian Samuil. After 1018, the city was again included into the Byzantine Empire, and since the end of the 11th century, Sirmium was a subject of a dispute between the Byzantine Empire and the Kingdom of Hungary, until 1180 when the Byzantine Empire gave up Sirmium, surrendering it to the Kingdom of Hungary. In the 11th century, a Byzantine province named Theme of Sirmium had its capital in this city.

For a while, about 1451, the city was in possession of the Serbian despot Đurađ Branković. In 1521 the city came into Ottoman hands and it remained under the Ottoman rule for almost two centuries. According to Ottoman traveler Evliya Çelebi, Mitrovica had been conquered by the Bosnian sanjak bey Husrev-bey. It was renamed as "Dimitrofça".

The name of the mayor of the city was Dimitar and since the middle of the 16th century, the city was mostly populated with Muslims. According to the 1566/69 data, the population of the city was composed of 592 Muslim and 30 Christian houses,  while according to the 1572 data, it was composed of 598 Muslim and 18 Christian houses.

According to the 1573 data, the city had 17 mosques and no Christian church. During the Ottoman rule, Sremska Mitrovica was the largest settlement in Syrmia, and was the administrative center of the Ottoman Sanjak of Syrmia. It was temporarily occupied by Austrian troops between 1688 and 1690. They finally took it in 1717 and took possession of it after signing Treaty of Passarowitz in 1718.

With the establishment of the Habsburg administration in 1718, the Muslim population fled from the city and was replaced with Serbian, Croatian, and German settlers. According to the 1765 data, the population of the city numbered 809 people, of whom 514 were Serbs and 290 Catholics.

Sremska Mitrovica was part of the Habsburg Military Frontier (Slavonian Krajina). In 1848-49, it was part of the Serbian Voivodship, a Serb autonomous region within Austrian Empire, but in 1849, it was returned under administration of the Military Frontier. With the abolition of the Slavonian Military Frontier in 1881, Sremska Mitrovica was included into Syrmia County, which was part of the Kingdom of Croatia-Slavonia within Austria-Hungary.

According to the 1910 census, the population of the city numbered 12,909 people, of which 8,793 spoke the Serbo-Croatian language (4,878 of those spoke Serbian and 3,915 spoke Croatian) and 2,341 German. The administrative area of the city (which did not included the city itself) had 32,012 inhabitants, of which 28,093 spoke Serbo-Croatian (27,022 of those spoke Serbian and 1,071 spoke Croatian) and 2,324 German.

After the First World War
In 1918, the Austro-Hungarian monarchy collapsed and the Syrmia region first became a part of the newly formed State of Slovenes, Croats and Serbs, and then, on 24 November 1918, the assembly of Syrmia in Ruma decided most of Syrmia (including Mitrovica) would join the Kingdom of Serbia.

Subsequently, on 1 December 1918, Kingdom of Serbia united with the Kingdom of Montenegro and the State of Slovenes, Croats and Serbs to form the Kingdom of Serbs, Croats and Slovenes (renamed to Yugoslavia in 1929). Between 1918-22, Sremska Mitrovica was part of the Syrmia County, between 1922-29 part of the Syrmia Oblast, between 1929-31 part of the Drina Banovina, and, between 1931–41, part of the Danube Banovina.

During World War II, the city was occupied by Axis troops and was attached to the Independent State of Croatia. During that time its name was changed to Hrvatska Mitrovica (meaning Croatian Mitrovica). One of the largest Nazi concentration/death camps in the Independent State of Croatia existed in Sremska Mitrovica and as many as 10,000 victims (Serbs, Jews, and antifascists) were killed here.

The Serbian Jewish population was to be interned in a concentration camp built first in Jarak and then at Zasavica. However, both locations proved to be too flooded for construction. The Germans had to abandon these locations and use Sajmište, which resulted in the destruction of 83% of Serbian Jewry.

In the Yugoslav wars in Sremska Mitrovica Prison, some Croatian prisoners of war were kept in this prison. The main prison facility; the largest known in Serbia, was open from November 1991 to August 1992 and was a scene where many prisoners were killed, tortured, abused and raped.

Beginning in 1944, the town was part of the Autonomous Province of Vojvodina within the new Socialist Yugoslavia and, from 1945, within the Socialist Republic of Serbia. From 1992 to 2003 it was part of the Federal Republic of Yugoslavia, which was then transformed into the state union of Serbia and Montenegro. Since the 2006 independence of Montenegro, Sremska Mitrovica is part of an independent Serbia.

Inhabited places

The city of Sremska Mitrovica includes the town of Mačvanska Mitrovica, and several villages. Villages on the northern bank of the river Sava, in the region of Syrmia:

Bešenovački Prnjavor
Bešenovo
Bosut
Čalma
Divoš
Grgurevci
Jarak
Kuzmin
Laćarak
Ležimir
Manđelos
Martinci
Sremska Rača
Stara Bingula
Šašinci
Šišatovac
Šuljam
Veliki Radinci

Villages on the southern bank of the river Sava, in the region of Mačva:

Noćaj
Radenković
Ravnje
Salaš Noćajski
Zasavica I
Zasavica II

Demographics
 According to the 2011 census results, the city administrative area has a population of 79,940 inhabitants.

Ethnic groups
Most of the settlements in the city have an ethnic Serb majority. Ethnically mixed settlement with relative Serb majority is Stara Bingula. The main concentration of ethnic minorities is in the urban area of the city.

The ethnic composition of the city:

Religion
In 2002, the population of city of Sremska Mitrovica included 76,290 Orthodox Christians, 3,935 Roman Catholics, 252 Protestants and 106 Muslims. Orthodox Christians in Sremska Mitrovica are belonging to the Eparchy of Syrmia of the Serbian Orthodox Church. Catholics belong to the Diocese of Syrmia, which has its seat in Sremska Mitrovica.

Climate
Sremska Mitrovica has a humid subtropical climate bordering very closely on a humid continental climate (Köppen climate classification: Dfb) as well as an oceanic climate (Köppen climate classification: Cfb).

Economy

The following table gives a preview of total number of registered people employed in legal entities per their core activity (as of 2018):

Sport
KAF Sirmium Legionaries, an American Football club from Sremska Mitrovica. This is the first club of American Football in Serbia.
FK Srem, a football club from Sremska Mitrovica.
KK Val, a canoe club from Sremska Mitrovica.

Famous and notable residents

Roman emperors

Ten Roman emperors were born in the city and its environs:

Decius Traian (249–51)
Herennius Etruscus (251-51)
Hostilian (251-51)
Claudius II (268-270)
Quintillus (270)
Aurelian (270–75)
Probus (276–82)
Maximianus Herculius (285–310)
Constantius II (337–61)
Gratian (367–83)

The last emperor of the united Roman Empire, Theodosius I (378–95), became emperor in Sirmium. The usurpers Ingenuus and Regalianus also declared themselves emperors in this city (in 260) and many other Roman emperors spent some time in Sirmium including Marcus Aurelius who might have written parts of his famous work Meditations in the city.

Classical antiquity
Marcus Aurelius, Roman emperor (161-180), used Sirmium as a residence in between pannonian military campaigns 170-180
Maximinus, Roman emperor (235-238), ruled from residence in Sirmium.
Herennius Etruscus, Roman emperor (251), born in Sirmium.
Hostilian, Roman emperor (251), born in Sirmium
Decius Traian, Roman emperor (249-251), born in village Budalia near Sirmium.
Ingenuus, Roman emperor (260), proclaimed himself emperor in Sirmium.
Regalianus, Roman emperor (260), proclaimed himself emperor in Sirmium.
Claudius II, Roman emperor (268-270), born in Sirmium and spent most of his life there.
Quintillus, Roman emperor (270), born in Sirmium
Aurelian, Roman emperor (270-275), born in Sirmium.
Probus, Roman emperor (276-282), born in Sirmium.
Maximianus Herculius, Roman emperor (285-310), born near Sirmium.
Galerius, Roman emperor (305-311), ruled as Caesar during the Tetrarchy from residence in Sirmium (293-296).
Crispus, a Caesar of the Roman Empire. He was proclaimed Caesar in Sirmium in 317.
Constantine II, a Caesar of the Roman Empire. He was proclaimed Caesar in Sirmium in 317.
Vetranion, Roman emperor. Proclaimed himself emperor in Sirmium (in 350).
Constantius II, Roman emperor (337-361), born in Sirmium.
Gratian, Roman emperor (367-383), born in Sirmium.
Theodosius I the Great, Roman emperor (378-395). He became emperor in Sirmium.
Valerius Licinius, prefect of the Diocese of Pannonia with residence in Sirmium (308-314).
Aurelius Victor, prefect of the Pannonia Secunda province, wrote a History of Rome under the emperor Julian.
Leontius, prefect in Sirmium (426).

Middle ages

Cunimund, king of the Gepids with residence in Sirmium.
Sermon, duke of Syrmia (11th century).

Modern period
Mira Banjac, Serbian actress
Vaso Čubrilović, Serbian historian
Robert Frangeš-Mihanović, Croatian sculptor
Petar Gburčik, Serbian scientist
Nikola Hristić (1818–1911), Serbian politician
Branislav Ivanović, Serbian footballer
Siniša Kovačević, Serbian author
Petar Kralj, Serbian actor
Mileva Marić, Serbian scientist
Đorđe Marković Koder (1806–1891), Serbian writer
Dejan Milovanović, Serbian footballer
Stjepan Musulin, Croatian linguist and lexicographer
Milijana Nikolić, operatic mezzo-soprano
Boško Palkovljević Pinki, People's Hero of Yugoslavia
Veljko Petrović, Serbian poet
Igor Pisanjuk (1989), Canadian football player
Mirjana Puhar (1995-2015), Serbian - American model
Ilarion Ruvarac (1832–1905), Serbian Churchman and historian
Mara Švel-Gamiršek (1900–1975), Croatian writer
Dragana Tomašević, Serbian discus thrower
Zlatko Tomčić, Croatian politician
Slavko Vorkapić, Serbian-American film director and editor

International relations

Twin towns – sister cities
Sremska Mitrovica is twinned with:
 Banja Luka, Bosnia-Herzegovina
 Dunaújváros, Hungary

See also
List of cities, towns and villages in Vojvodina
List of cities in Serbia
Councils of Sirmium
Sremska Mitrovica railway station

References

External links

 
Sremska Mitrovica.org - info, news about Sremska Mitrovica
Information portal on culture, sport and fun in Sremska Mitrovica

 
Populated places in Srem District
Populated places in Syrmia
Syrmia County
Municipalities and cities of Vojvodina